This is a list of members of the 44th Legislative Assembly of Queensland from 1983 to 1986, as elected at the 1983 state election held on 22 October 1983.

 On 9 March 1984, the Labor member for Archerfield, Kevin Hooper, died. The Labor candidate Henry Palaszczuk won the resulting by-election on 19 May 1984.
 On 21 June 1984, the Labor member for Stafford, Dr Denis Murphy died. The Liberal candidate Terry Gygar, the member for Stafford from 1974 to 1983, won the resulting by-election on 4 August 1984.
 Col Miller, the member for Ithaca, was elected as a member of the Liberal Party, but resigned from the party in August 1984 and served out the remainder of his term as an independent.
 On 5 November 1984, the Labor member for Rockhampton and Opposition Leader, Keith Wright, resigned from parliament in order to contest the Australian House of Representatives seat of Capricornia at the 1984 federal election. The Labor candidate Paul Braddy won the resulting by-election on 16 February 1985.
 On 10 September 1985, the National member for Redlands, John Goleby, died in a farming accident. National Party candidate Paul Clauson won the resulting by-election on 2 November 1985.

See also
1983 Queensland state election
Premier: Joh Bjelke-Petersen (National Party) (1968–1987)

References

 

Members of Queensland parliaments by term
20th-century Australian politicians